Task Force is a 1949 war film filmed in black-and-white with some Technicolor sequences about the development of U.S. aircraft carriers from  to . Although Robert Montgomery was originally considered for the leading role, the film stars Gary Cooper, Jane Wyatt, Walter Brennan, Wayne Morris, Julie London and Jack Holt. Task Force was the only film Gary Cooper and Jane Wyatt made together, and was the last of the eight films Cooper and Walter Brennan made together. The U.S. Navy provided complete support in not only lending naval vessels and facilities, but also allowed the use of archival footage of the development of naval air power.

Plot
As a 1917 graduate of the Naval Academy, Naval Aviator Jonathan L. "Scotty" Scott (Gary Cooper) spends 28 years, from 1921 to 1949, promoting U.S. naval aviation and the power of the aircraft carrier. During that period, he antagonizes powerful people in the U.S. Navy and the U.S. Congress, and marries Mary Morgan (Jane Wyatt), the widow of a fellow flier who died in a crash during a carrier takeoff aboard . Throughout, Scott has the help and friendship of his mentor and superior officer, Pete Richard (Walter Brennan).

The Scotts spend two years in Hawaii and then move to Annapolis, where Scott, now a lieutenant commander, is to teach naval aviation but his outspoken stand in favor of aircraft carriers in combat causes him to lose a promotion. After Japan invades Manchuria, Scott is offered a civilian sales position selling aircraft in Europe, but remains in the Navy.

After Pearl Harbor is attacked by the Japanese, Scott's ship, is heavily involved in action at the Battle of Midway. Scott later travels to Washington D.C. to plead for more carriers and eventually a carrier fleet is produced. During the Battle of Okinawa, the fleet, with Scott as the captain of the carrier , proves its worth. When his carrier flight deck is badly damaged by Japanese torpedo aircraft, the ship is forced to withdraw to the U.S. for repairs and the war ends when they arrive in at the Navy Yard in New York City. Four years after the end of the war, Scott, as a rear admiral, retires and joins Mary, who is waiting for him on the dock.

While much of the archive footage used for the ship commanded by Scott was of the USS Franklin, the actual situation more closely resembles the attacks on USS Bunker Hill. Especially as in real life, Franklin had already been knocked out of the war before the invasion of Okinawa began.

Cast
As appearing in Task Force, (main roles and screen credits identified):

 Gary Cooper as Jonathan L. Scott 
 Jane Wyatt as Mary Morgan 
 Wayne Morris as McKinney 
 Walter Brennan as Pete Richard 
 Julie London as Barbara McKinney 
 Bruce Bennett as Rear Admiral C. Wade McClusky
 Jack Holt as Admiral Joseph M. Reeves 
 Stanley Ridges as Senator Bentley 
 John Ridgely as Dixie Rankin 
 Richard Rober as Jack Southern 
 Art Baker as Senator Vincent 
 Moroni Olsen as Admiral Ames 
 Ray Montgomery as Pilot 
 Harlan Warde as Timmy Kissell

Uncredited cast

 Gregg Barton as Pilot
 Edmond O'Brien as Radio announcer 
 Mary Lawrence as Ruth Rankin

Production
Principal photography began in late 1948 on the escort carrier,  to replicate USS Langley, as well as Naval Air Station North Island in San Diego. The U.S. Navy provided access to naval facilities with costs amounting to as much as $24,000 a day  ($ today) being incurred when an admiral's barge and jet fighters were commandeered. Additional work took place at the Burbank studios to cover interiors and process shots. Production finally wrapped on January 5, 1949.

Near the end of the film, the film changes from black and white to Technicolor in order to unobtrusively use actual combat film shot in color. The change comes just after a scene showing a contentious meeting in Washington D.C. in which Brennan and Cooper argue with a senator who wants to stop building carriers.  After some aerial shots of a task force at sea and an aircraft landing on a carrier, still in black-and-white, a shot of a sailor in combat gear silhouetted against the sky is in color, but filtered to make it sepia, a technique similar to that used on the transitional shot of Dorothy opening the door of her house to reveal Munchkinland in The Wizard of Oz. This is followed by Cooper at night walking the deck of his first command, still in sepia, and aircraft taking off at night.  The next shot, of a naval task force with air cover, is in full color.

Complications set in during the filming of Task Force as consecutively, four separate crews were at work with the resultant task of merging all of the live action and archival footage. One of the near disasters involved a delivery truck that caught on fire with its load of cut and stock film along with daily rushes, personal baggage and makeup destroyed. More serious was a series of accidents involving the star, who had already expressed reservation both about the script and his perceived inadequacies as an actor. In December 1948, Cooper was on a navy barge that broke down in fog, and began to take on water, almost foundering on the rocks in Long Beach harbor before he was rescued by a navy ship. Cooper was subsequently hospitalized with a high fever. He was nearly seriously injured on another occasion. Wayne Morris who portrayed Lt. McKinney was the only actual carrier pilot in the cast and  served on the USS Essex, becoming an "Ace" by shooting down 7 Japanese planes and assisting in the sinking of 5 Japanese ships.

Historical accuracy

When Cooper and Brennan attend the mid-1920s reception in Washington, D.C., the Chief of Naval Operations is called "Admiral Ames" (Moroni Olsen); the real CNO was Admiral Edward Walter Eberle. The movie CNO is clean shaven, Eberle had a full beard. Seen listening to Scott (Gary Cooper) tell Sen. Bentley (Stanley Ridges) about the use of aircraft carriers over battleships in future naval warfare and that Japan is a threat to the United States, the real Japanese naval attaché who would have heard that conversation was Captain Isoroku Yamamoto. Later, Admiral Yamamoto would be the architect of the attack on Pearl Harbor.

While Cooper's character Scott is shown as captain of the carrier  at the Battle of Okinawa, the ship was actually commanded by Captain Leslie E. Gehres.

Aircraft used in the film
Paul Mantz did much of the flying in the early aerial sequences. 
 Boeing B-17 Flying Fortress
 Boeing Model 100 standing in for a Curtiss F8C-2 Helldiver
 Curtiss F8C-2 Helldiver
 Curtiss P-36 Hawk standing in for a Mitsubishi A6M Zero
 Douglas SBD Dauntless
 Douglas TBD Devastator
 Grumman F4F Wildcat
 Grumman F6F Hellcat
 Grumman F9F Panther
 Grumman TBM Avenger
 Kawanishi H8K
 Mitsubishi A6M Zero
 Nakajima B6N
 Orenco Model F standing in for a Vought VE-7
 Vought SB2U Vindicator
 Vought VE-7

In popular culture
In the film, White Heat, when Arthur "Cody" Jarrett played by James Cagney is chased by federal investigators, to lose them, he drives the car into San-Val Drive In, where Task Force is showing. Later in the movie, when Cody's mother is interrogated by the cops, she says that she was with Verna (Virginia Mayo) watching the film and that it was "exciting."

Reception

Box office
When released years after the end of World War II, Task Force was inevitably compared to wartime features and documentaries that chronicled the efforts of the U.S. Navy. Audiences on a whole, received the film enthusiastically, making it one of the "largest grossing pictures" of the postwar era.

According to Warner Bros records, the film earned $2,481,000 domestically and $1,590,000 foreign.

Critical reaction
Bosley Crowther of The New York Times noted that when the film concentrates on "real carrier activity out at sea and the actual aspects of recent warfare, it springs into vivid, thrilling life." Playing on the propaganda-like message of Task Force, Radio Moscow decried it, "a film which glorifies war, and calls for the militarization of the country's whole life."

Notes

References

Bibliography

 Arce, Hector. Gary Cooper: An Intimate Biography. New York: Bantam Books, 1980, First edition 1979. .
 Evans, Alun. Brassey's Guide to War Films. Dulles, Virginia: Potomac Books, 2000. .
 Farmer, James H. "Hollywood Goes to North Island NAS." Air Classics, Volume 25, No. 9, September 1989.
 Meyer, Jeffrey. Gary Cooper: American Hero. New York: William Morrow, 1998. .
 Orriss, Bruce. When Hollywood Ruled the Skies: The Aviation Film Classics of World War II. Hawthorne, California: Aero Associates Inc., 1984. .

External links
 
 
 
 Task Force film review at Classic Film Guide

1940s war drama films
1949 films
American aviation films
American black-and-white films
American war drama films
Films about the United States Navy in World War II
Films directed by Delmer Daves
Films produced by Jerry Wald
Films scored by Franz Waxman
Pacific War films
Pearl Harbor films
Warner Bros. films
1940s American films
1940s English-language films